Hernán Darío Ortiz (born 14 July 1967) is an Argentine football manager and former professional footballer who played as a defender. He is currently the manager of Mitre.

Playing career
Ortiz's career started in 1989 with Gimnasia y Esgrima. He made his debut in the Argentine Primera División, which was the first of two hundred and fifteen appearances in Argentina's top tier. After seven years with Gimnasia y Esgrima, Ortiz left in 1996 to play for Huracán of the Primera División. He scored one goal in thirty-six matches during 1996–97 which ended with relegation. He remained in the Primera División as he signed for Gimnasia y Tiro but suffered relegation yet again following twenty-two appearances. Ortiz ended his career with moves to Primera B Nacional teams Almirante Brown and Independiente Rivadavia.

Coaching career
Ortiz made his first step into football management in May 2011, as he became manager of former club Gimnasia y Esgrima. He drew his first match in charge against Quilmes. He departed the club in July 2011 as Gimnasia y Esgrima were relegated to Primera B Nacional. On 8 April 2012, Ortiz was appointed Primera B Nacional side Boca Unidos's new manager. He guided them to a fifth-place finish in 2011–12, missing the play-offs by twelve points. He remained until December 2012 when he resigned. June 2014 saw Ortiz become the manager of Estudiantes alongside Pablo Morant in Torneo Federal A.

In his first season, 2014, Estudiantes won promotion to Primera B Nacional after finishing top of Zone 2. He left Estudiantes in August 2015. Almost a year later, in July 2016, Ortiz was appointed by Primera B Nacional's Atlético Paraná. He was sacked in April 2017 following just six wins in twenty-four games. Ortiz was made the caretaker manager of Gimnasia y Esgrima on 22 April 2018 following the sacking of Facundo Sava. In his final league match of 2017–18, Ortiz won the first match of his caretaker tenure. Gimnasia y Esgrima beat Newell's Old Boys 2–0, with Darío's son Nicolás scoring the opening goal.

Ortiz was replaced by Pedro Troglio on 15 May. However, in the succeeding February he took over from Troglio on a full-time basis following the latter's sacking. Despite successfully avoiding relegation in 2018–19, Ortiz was dismissed within two months of their 2019–20 campaign after a run four losses in five league games. He was replaced by Diego Maradona. In March 2020, Ortiz was announced as the new manager of Primera B Nacional side Mitre.

Personal life
Ortiz is the father of current professional footballer Nicolás Ortiz.

Managerial statistics
.

Honours
Gimnasia y Esgrima
Copa Centenario de la AFA: 1994

References

External links

1967 births
Living people
Sportspeople from Mendoza Province
Argentine footballers
Argentine football managers
Association football defenders
Argentine Primera División players
Argentine Primera División managers
Primera Nacional players
Primera B Nacional managers
Torneo Federal A managers
Club de Gimnasia y Esgrima La Plata footballers
Huracán Corrientes footballers
Gimnasia y Tiro footballers
Almirante Brown de Arrecifes players
Independiente Rivadavia footballers
Club de Gimnasia y Esgrima La Plata managers
Boca Unidos managers
Club Sportivo Estudiantes managers
Club Atlético Paraná managers
Club Atlético Mitre managers